Lawayqu (Aymara for "long-necked", also spelled Lahuayko, Lawaykho) is a  mountain in the Bolivian Andes. It is located in the Cochabamba Department, Carrasco Province, Pocona Municipality. Lawayqu lies southwest of Jatun Salla and southeast of Qucha Quchayuq Urqu and Rumi Rumiyuq.

References 

Mountains of Cochabamba Department